Esteban Fernandino may refer to:
 Esteban Fernandino I, Argentine racing driver, father of Chango Fernandino 
 Esteban Fernandino II, Argentine racing driver, better known as Chango and son of Esteban Fernandino I